Chaser is an album by guitarist Terje Rypdal with bassist Bjørn Kjellemyr and drummer Audun Kleive recorded in 1985 and released on the ECM label.

Reception
The Allmusic review by  Michael P. Dawson awarded the album 4 stars stating "This 1985 release finds Rypdal working in a hard-hitting power-trio format".

Track listing
All compositions by Terje Rypdal except as indicated
 "Ambiguity" - 8:45 
 "Once upon a Time" - 6:16 
 "Geysir" (Bjørn Kjellemyr, Audun Kleive, Terje Rypdal) - 6:01 
 "A Closer Look" - 5:04 
 "Ørnen" - 6:23 
 "Chaser" - 5:51 
 "Transition" - 1:38 
 "Imagi (Theme)" - 4:59 
Recorded at Rainbow Studio in Oslo, Norway in May 1985

Personnel
Terje Rypdal — electric guitar 
Bjørn Kjellemyr — acoustic bass, electric bass
Audun Kleive — drums, percussion

References

ECM Records albums
Terje Rypdal albums
1985 albums
Albums produced by Manfred Eicher